Rascal Flatts is the self-titled debut studio album by American country music group Rascal Flatts, released on June 6, 2000 on Lyric Street Records. It sold 2,303,000 in the United States up to May 2009, and has been certified 2× Platinum by the RIAA.

The album produced four singles on the Billboard country charts in "Prayin' for Daylight", "This Everyday Love", "While You Loved Me" and "I'm Movin' On", all of which charted in the Top Ten on the Billboard Hot Country Songs charts. "Long Slow Beautiful Dance" (which featured them all on lead vocals) also charted in the lower regions of the charts based on unsolicited airplay. It is the only album of the band's career not to feature a number one single or to feature any songs produced by the band. While the band's contemporaries, such as Tim McGraw and Kenny Chesney, started with a neotraditional country sound, the band had a crossover-friendly country pop sound from the very beginning.

Track listing

Personnel 
Rascal Flatts
 Jay DeMarcus – backing vocals, bass guitar (9), lead vocals (10)
 Gary LeVox – lead vocals
 Joe Don Rooney – backing vocals, lead vocals (10)

Additional musicians
 Brian Siewert – keyboards (1, 9, 10)
 Tim Akers – keyboards (2-8, 11)
 Larry Beaird – acoustic guitar
 Dann Huff – electric guitar (2-4, 6, 7), solo (3, 7)
 George Marinelli, Jr. – electric guitar (1, 9, 10)
 Brent Mason – electric guitar (1, 2, 5-11)
 Paul Franklin – steel guitar
 Jonathan Yudkin – mandolin,  fiddle, cello, viola, violin
 Joe Chemay – bass guitar (1, 10)
 Mike Brignardello – bass guitar (2-8, 11)
 Lonnie Wilson – drums

Production 
 Mark Bright – producer 
 Marty Williams – producer, engineer, mixing, mastering 
 Christopher Rowe – engineer 
 Shawn Simpson – engineer
 John Guess – mixing 
 Mike "Frog" Griffith – production coordinator 
 Sherri Halford – art direction 
 Greg McCarn – art direction 
 Glenn Sweitzer – design 
 Russ Harrington – photography 
 Ann Waters – stylist 
 Debra Wingo – hair stylist, make-up

Chart performance

Weekly charts

Year-end charts

Singles

Notes
A ^ "Prayin' for Daylight" peaked at number 4 on the RPM Country Tracks chart in Canada.

Certifications

References

2000 debut albums
Rascal Flatts albums
Lyric Street Records albums
Albums produced by Mark Bright (record producer)